HCZ may refer to:

 Harlem Children's Zone, a nonprofit organization for poverty-stricken children and families living in Harlem
 HCZ, the IATA code for Chenzhou Beihu Airport, Hunan, China